Anil Ravipudi (born 23 November 1982) is an Indian film director and screenwriter who works in Telugu cinema.

He made his directorial debut with the action comedy Pataas (2015). He then directed two action comedies Supreme (2016) and Raja The Great (2017) and then the comedy F2: Fun and Frustration (2019) and one more action comedy Sarileru Neekevvaru (2020). F2 was featured in the "Indian Panorama" Mainstream section of the 50th International Film Festival of India.

Career
After completing B.Tech in 2005, Ravipudi joined as an assistant director to his uncle P. A. Arun Prasad. He then worked as a dialogue writer for films like Sankham (2009), Kandireega (2011) and co-wrote the script for films Masala (2013) and Aagadu (2014). Anil Ravipudi worked with Santosh Srinivas in the latter's directorial debut Kandireega (2011) as a writer and wrote the script of Pataas. He later approached Nandamuri Kalyan Ram through a friend. After completing the writing, he again approached Kalyan Ram and both began working on the film. The film received positive reviews from critics and became successful at box-office and it was produced by Kalyan Ram.

Filmography

Awards and nominations

References

External links 

 
 

Living people
Indian male screenwriters
Telugu screenwriters
Slapstick comedians
21st-century Indian dramatists and playwrights
21st-century Indian film directors
Telugu film directors
Film directors from Andhra Pradesh
People from Guntur district
Screenwriters from Andhra Pradesh
21st-century Indian screenwriters
Santosham Film Awards winners
1982 births
South Indian International Movie Awards winners